Johnny Mnemonic is a 4 player pinball machine from August 1995, manufactured by Williams Electronic Games, Inc. A total of 2,756 units were produced.

Description 
Johnny Mnemonic is a 1995 pinball machine based on the movie of the same name, created by George Gomez and Williams Electronics, with artwork by John Youssi. Designer George Gomez had been inspired by author William Gibson's original cyberpunk short story Johnny Mnemonic, but based the game and its features, such as a player-controlled glove that used a magnet to lift the ball off the playfield, on the film's assets. Unfortunately, the film was a box office failure, and its poor showing affected sales of the game despite high pinball ratings. Although, today the movie is considered undervalued. According to inverse.com, Johnny Mnemonic is an overlooked gem in Reeves’ filmography that does deserve to sit in the shadow of The Matrix.

In 1995, the Johnny Mnemonic movie didn't become the blockbuster movie that Williams may have hoped for when obtaining the license. But the machine is heavily underrated according to Pinside, TV-tropes and Paste Magazine.. The same thing happened to "The Shadow" machine. The fast gameplay, strong sounds (although not 'custom' sampled from the real actors) and incredibly fun rules make this one of those "must have played" machines according to Pinside.

This game ranks #106 in the Pinside Pinball Top 100. It has received 353 approved Pinsider ratings and currently has a rating of 7.788 out of 10. Average Fun Rating on Internet Pinball Database is 7.8/10  (108 ratings/78 comments).

The Johnny Mnemonic pinball machine is also depicted and analyzed in the acclaimed book Pinball Wizards: Jackpots, Drains, and the Cult of the Silver Ball by Adam Ruben in 2017.

According to research paper from 2007 (TEXT Technology), Andrea Austin highlights, that  the Johnny Mnemonic pinball game portrays a stylized cyberspace and torn fragments of comic book code along with Johnny on the board surface as an interestingly nostalgic twist.

Notable Features 

Cyber Matrix Ball Lock assembly, featuring nine slots that each hold a 'per-game-random' award. Magnetic hand (data hand / cyber- glove) assembly that 'catches' the ball. The player can then move the hand over the "Cyber Matrix" with the four flipper buttons and release the ball into one of the nine slots. Power Down is wizard mode, which shuts down the pin, part for part, while you need to keep four balls from draining. A bit similar to the end game of "The Shadow", where you shoot all lights out until the pin shuts down. The four flipper buttons control a 'pacman-like' creature that bounces around the Dot Matrix Display. Johnny Mnemonic has also a 'Midnight Madness' mode. When the internal clock hits midnight, a special mode will be active. For more on Rule Sheets and features

Marketing 
The Marketing slogans are "Meet the ultimate hard drive.", "Gigabytes / Gigabucks.", "The Ultimate Mind Game", "Get Johnny Mnemonic and you'll be in the Mnemoney."

In 'attract' / standby mode (intended to get peoples attention at an arcade) a character named J-Bone says: "Don't be a zombie — play pinball!"

See also promo video for the 1995 Williams Pinball Johnny Mnemonic

The voice of the powerdown virtual character is done by famous American pinball and video game designer Steve Ritchie.

During Johnny Mnemonic's "Frenzy" mode, be sure to pay attention to the voice calls. You will hear the familiar laugh of one of Williams' more famous characters...Funhouse's Rudy. Also listen for J-Bone, as he will ask for a hot dog (ala Funhouse).

Cybernetic support is listed on the machine's playfield, which for example consists of the renowned professional pinball player, Roger Sharpe.

References 

Pinball
Pinball machines
Pinball machines based on films